Aivars Lazdenieks (born 26 February 1954) is a Latvian rower who competed for the Soviet Union in the 1976 Summer Olympics.

In 1976 he was a crew member of the Soviet boat which won the silver medal in the quadruple sculls event.

References

External links
 

1954 births
Living people
Latvian male rowers
Soviet male rowers
Olympic rowers of the Soviet Union
Rowers at the 1976 Summer Olympics
Olympic silver medalists for the Soviet Union
Olympic medalists in rowing
People from Skrunda Municipality
World Rowing Championships medalists for the Soviet Union
Medalists at the 1976 Summer Olympics